Gintarė Volungevičiūtė-Scheidt (born November 12, 1982) is an Olympic medal-winning dinghy sailor from Lithuania.

Career
Growing up in Kaunas, she frequently went to the Kaunas Reservoir yacht club, where her uncle worked. Growing fond of sailing, she decided at an early age to take up the sport.
 
Volungevičiūtė competed in the Olympic debut series for the women's single-handed dinghy class, the Laser Radial, during the 2008 Summer Olympics in China. She was the only sailor in the Lithuanian 2008 Olympic team. Volungevičiūtė won the 4th and 5th fleet races in the Olympic Laser Radial series, as well as the medal race, the last (10th), winning the silver medal.

During a test event for the Olympics China held in 2007,  Volungevičiūtė met Brazilian sailor Robert Scheidt, a two-time Laser gold medalist - who would also win a medal in 2008, in the Star class. The two started dating, and married in October 2008, with Gintarė taking his surname. The couple lives in Italy with their two children.

Scheidt was chosen as the Lithuania flag bearer during the 2016 Summer Olympics.

Olympics results

Other notable international results

References

External links
  (archive)
 
 

Olympic sailors of Lithuania
Sailors at the 2008 Summer Olympics – Laser Radial
Sailors at the 2012 Summer Olympics – Laser Radial
Sailors at the 2016 Summer Olympics – Laser Radial
Olympic silver medalists for Lithuania
Lithuanian female sailors (sport)
Expatriate sportspeople in Brazil
Expatriate sportspeople in Italy
1982 births
Living people
Olympic medalists in sailing
Naturalized citizens of Brazil
Brazilian people of Lithuanian descent
Sportspeople from Kaunas
Medalists at the 2008 Summer Olympics
Snipe class sailors
Lithuanian Sports University alumni